Annachlamys striatula is a species of bivalve in the family Pectinidae that is native to the Philippines.

References 

Pectinidae